Richard Corbet (1582 – 1635) was an English bishop and poet.

Richard Corbet may also refer to:
 (1451-1493), English knight
Richard Corbet (MP for Lynn) (1524-60 or later), MP for Lynn (UK Parliament constituency)
Richard Corbet (died 1566), MP for Shropshire
Richard Corbet (died 1606), MP for Shropshire
Sir Richard Corbet, 2nd Baronet (1640–1683), MP for Shrewsbury
Sir Richard Corbet, 4th Baronet (1696–1774), of the Corbet baronets, MP for Shrewsbury

See also
Richard Corbett, former Member of the European Parliament